To Wish You a Merry Christmas is an album by Harry Belafonte Recorded May 27, 31, June 1, 3 and 8 of 1958 in Hollywood.
Conducted by Bob Corman. Millard Thomas and Laurindo Almeida, guitarists. Produced and directed by Ed Welker.

Track listing

Original LP
To Wish You a Merry Christmas was originally released in 1958 as RCA Victor catalog number LPM/LSP-1887. The original LP cover featured an illustration of the Three Wise Men and a listing of the songs in front.
Side 1:
"A Star in the East" - 4:15
"The Gifts They Gave" - 3:58
"The Son of Mary" - 3:21
"The Twelve Days of Christmas" - 3:49
"Where the Little Jesus Sleeps" - 2:05
"Medley: The Joys of Christmas; Oh Little Town of Bethlehem; Deck the Halls; The First Noël" - 5:25
Side 2:
"Mary, Mary" - 3:21
"Jehova the Lord Will Provide" - 2:57
"Silent Night" - 3:35
"Christmas Is Coming" - 1:38
"Medley: We Wish You a Merry Christmas; God Rest Ye Merry, Gentlemen; O Come All Ye Faithful; Joy to the World" - 4:29
"I Heard the Bells on Christmas Day" - 3:03

Re-release 1
The album was repackaged in 1962 as RCA Victor catalog number LPM/LSP-2626, with a different cover (with Belafonte's picture this time) and adding the song "Mary's Boy Child" (from An Evening with Belafonte) to Side 2. The credits are also slightly different, listing conductor Bob Corman as Robert De Cormier.
Side 1:  identical to the 1958 release.
Side 2:
"Mary's Boy Child" - 4:20
"Silent Night" - 3:35
"Christmas Is Coming" - 2:56
"Mary, Mary" - 3:34
"Jehova the Lord Will Provide" - 2:57
"Medley: We Wish You a Merry Christmas; God Rest Ye Merry, Gentlemen; O Come All Ye Faithful; Joy to the World" - 4:26
"I Heard the Bells on Christmas Day" - 3:01

Re-release 2

In 1976, the songs were repackaged again, under the title Belafonte's Christmas, from RCA Records Canada, catalog number KNLI-0166 .
The tracks are identical to the 1962 release, except that sides 1 and 2 have been switched (i.e. the first song of the album is now "Mary's Boy Child"). A completely different picture of Belafonte is used on the cover.

Re-release 3

In 2001, RCA  reissued the album on CD as Harry Belafonte Christmas, with five bonus tracks added:

 "Goin' Down Jordan" - 3:53
  "Amen" - 3:06
  "Glory Manger" - 4:39
 "The Baby Boy" - 3:25
  "Scarlet Ribbons (For Her Hair)" - 2:45

Personnel
 Laurindo Almeida	Guitar
 Dick Baxter	Digital Engineer, Engineer
 Harry Belafonte	Primary Artist, Vocals
 C.C. Carter	Composer
 Frantz Casseus	Guitar
 Corman	Adaptation
 Gene Corman	Composer
 Chick Crumpacker	Digital Producer
 Robert DeCormier	Adaptation, Choir Director, Composer, Conductor
 Dennis Farnon	Producer
 Franz Gruber	Composer
 Jester Hairston	Composer
 Henry Wadsworth Longfellow	Composer
 Johnny Marks	Adaptation, Composer
 Milton Okun	Composer
 The Orchestra	Unknown Contributor Role
 Henri René	Producer
 Millard Thomas	Guitar
 Traditional	Composer
 Don Wardell	Digital Series Coordination
 Ed Welker	Producer
 Watson Wylie	Liner Notes

References

1958 Christmas albums
Harry Belafonte albums
Christmas albums by American artists
RCA Records Christmas albums
Covers albums
Albums conducted by Robert De Cormier
Albums conducted by Laurindo Almeida
Folk Christmas albums